Star Over The Bay (foaled February 5, 1998, in Florida - died in Singapore on May 15, 2005) was a Thoroughbred racehorse who rose from the claimer ranks and earned more than $700,000.

In early 2004, at age five, the light gray was claimed at Hollywood Park. Under the guidance of new trainer Mike Mitchell, he soon won three consecutive graded turf races, including the 2004 Grade II Sunset Handicap in a wire-to-wire effort.  Star Over The Bay's biggest win came in the January 2005 running of the Sunshine Millions Turf at Santa Anita Park under Eclipse Award-winning jockey Tyler Baze.

On May 15, 2005, at age seven, Star Over The Bay fractured his right foreleg (sesamoid).  He was near the front of the field at the half mile pole in the Grade I US$1.8 million (SGD $3 million) Singapore Airlines International Cup at Kranji Racecourse when he broke down. He was humanely euthanized on the track. Mitchell said: ""I saw Tyler pulling him up and didn't realize how bad it was until he came back crying.  If I could have just brought him back and retired him, I would feel so much better."

References

 Star Over The Bay’s pedigree plus photo
 Mitchell responds to Star Over The Bay's death
 Mitchell's NTRA bio
 G Racing NTRA bio
 The Daily Racing Form on Star Over The Bay

1998 racehorse births
2005 racehorse deaths
Racehorses trained in the United States
Racehorses bred in Florida
Horses who died from racing injuries